Oenomaus may refer to:

 Oenomaus, a king of Pisa in Greek mythology
 Oenomaus (butterfly), a gossamer-winged butterfly genus
 Oenomaus (rebel slave) (c. 72 BC), Gallic rebel gladiator who fought in the Third Servile War
 Oenomaus of Gadara (2nd century AD), Cynic philosopher